Planning Policy Guidance 16: Archaeology and Planning commonly abbreviated as PPG 16, was a document produced by the UK Government to advise local planning authorities in England and Wales on the treatment of archaeology within the planning process. It was introduced in November 1990 following public outcry after a number of high-profile scandals such as the threatened destruction of the Rose Theatre in London by developers. It replaced the earlier Circular 8/87 which was criticized for being ill-focused in both practical and geographical terms. On 23 March 2010 the Government published 'Planning Policy Statement 5:Planning and the Historic Environment' replacing and cancelling PPG16 and PPG15 which had dealt with the rest of the historic environment.

What PPG 16 says

The document advised that archaeological remains are a finite and irreplaceable resource and that their presence should be a material consideration in applications for new development. It accepted that development will affect archaeological deposits and that this effect must be mitigated. PPG 16 stressed the importance of the evaluation of a site for its archaeological potential in advance of development in order to inform future management decisions. This evaluation may involve non intrusive methods such as a desk-based study or archaeological geophysics and/or a more direct method such as trial trenching.

Following the results of the initial evaluation, PPG 16 offered two solutions for preserving any significant archaeological deposits found to be on a development site. The first, and explicitly preferred, method involves preservation in situ whereby the archaeology is left untouched beneath a new development through methods such as adaptation of foundation design and architectural layout of the proposed new development, or by raising the level of the development with made ground so that its foundations do not reach the archaeological horizon. Where nationally important remains are encountered this method of preservation is strongly preferred.

If preservation in situ is not feasible then PPG 16 permitted preservation by record. This method involves archaeological fieldwork to excavate and record finds and features (thereby destroying them). This may involve a full excavation, further trenching in specific areas or an archaeological watching brief which involves an archaeologist monitoring groundworks for the new development and recording any finds or features revealed as construction continue.

PPG 16 in practice

All forms of archaeological investigation undertaken through PPG 16 are funded by the developer through an extension of the Polluter Pays principle, although this is not made explicit in the document itself. The work is intended to be undertaken in advance of any planning consent being granted but often happens to satisfy a planning condition placed on an application for development, that is once the principle of development on the land has already been established.

Because of the potential for destruction of significant remains, PPG 16 prefers evaluation to take place in advance of any planning decision being made.  A developer tenders for the work to be done and chooses an archaeological organization to retain. The work is monitored by a curator, normally the County Archaeologist, who is nominated by the local planning authority as an adviser and who also identifies sites where archaeology might be threatened by development. Following submission of a satisfactory site report and demonstration that a site's archaeological potential has been properly safeguarded and/or recorded, the curator will usually advise that development can continue.

Curators maintain a Historic Environment Record or HER, a database of known archaeological sites which is often used to inform decisions on archaeological potential. Areas of archaeological potential are often drawn on GIS maps which can indicate any potentially damaging development automatically.

PPG 16 has resulted in an explosion in archaeological fieldwork in the UK. Developer funding has led to dozens of archaeological organizations competing for work along with archaeological consultants working for developers to oversee projects. This has contributed to the growing professionalization of archaeology from its more ad hoc earlier incarnation as Rescue archaeology. Also, a wider variety of archaeological methods are now employed including surveys of large areas for the purposes of Historic Landscape Characterisation, deposit models and the production of regional archaeological research agendas.

Criticism of PPG 16 and its effects

Critics of PPG 16 argue that the commercialization of UK archaeology has resulted in more work of lower quality being undertaken, and that a shortage of county archaeologists to monitor this work allows consultants to exploit the situation. In recent years prices have been driven down by competing consultants who have unethical arrangements with archaeological contractors, who rather than performing the same job for a lower cost (as in true competitive tendering) are able to do a worse job. The increased volume of work has led to a backlog of unpublished site reports and homeless site archives awaiting resolution. The competition for work amongst archaeologists, and the fact that the developers funding them see no real use for their final product, also tends to drive prices down meaning that wages and conditions for archaeologists in the UK are generally far below the national average for equivalent professions with comparable levels of education. The irony is that the cost of this unworthy body of work, known as "grey archaeology", borne by the construction industry benefits nobody but the consultants who have something to "mitigate" on behalf of their clients in the construction industry.

PPG 16 was only guidance to planners and did not have the full force of law.  Its precepts could only be enforced through the Town and Country Planning Act and ultimate decisions on its implementation rested with the Secretary of State.  However, without full legal status it lacked the power and reach of measures safeguarding similar environmental issues which are enshrined in law, such as those concerning endangered species.

The theory of PPG 16

Theoretically, the philosophical approach of PPG 16 was strongly based on processualism, especially following the publication of the de facto guidance manual for UK developer-led archaeology, English Heritage's Management of Archaeological Projects (1991), popularly known as MAP 2. This stressed the importance of evaluation, documentation and decision-making at each stage of a project based on empirical evidence and valid hypotheses. From 2006 MAP2 was replaced by a more generic project management approach for the sector "Management of Research Projects in the Historic Environment" (MoRPHE) with a specific guidance "Project Planning Note 3" (MoRPHE PPN3) covering archaeological excavation. MoRPHE PPN3 retained the staged approach, with evaluation as a quality assessment technique that was applicable at any stage during an investigation.

Associated guidance and the future

A similar, though less stringent, guideline to PPG 16 exists for historic buildings and the wider historic environment called PPG 15. As of 2004 both documents are proposed to be combined into a single piece of guidance called a Planning Policy Statement.

See also
Planning Policy Guidance Notes
Town and country planning in the United Kingdom

Further reading

References

External links
 Planning Policy Guidance 16, formerly at the Communities and Local Government website

United Kingdom planning policy
Archaeology of the United Kingdom